Swansea East may refer to:

 Swansea East (UK Parliament constituency)
 Swansea East (Senedd constituency)